This is a list of cities and municipalities in the Philippines that are located on islands with no land borders with other local government units.

 Agutaya
 Almagro, Samar
 Anda, Pangasinan (Cabarruyan Island)
 Balabac, Palawan (Balabac and Bugsuk Islands)
 Banguingui, Sulu (Tongkil Islands)
 Banton, Romblon
 Biri, Northern Samar
 Cagayancillo
 Calayan, Cagayan (Babuyan Islands)
 Caluya, Antique
 Capul, Northern Samar
 Concepcion, Romblon (Maestro de Campo Island)
 Corcuera, Romblon (Simara Island)
 Cordova, Cebu (Cordoba Island and Olango Islands)
 Culion
 Daram, Samar
 Hadji Panglima Tahil, Sulu (Marungas Islands)
 Itbayat, Batanes
 Jomalig, Quezon
 Kalayaan, Palawan
 Lapu-Lapu, Cebu (Mactan Island and Olango Islands)
 Limasawa, Southern Leyte
 Linapacan
 Lugus, Sulu
 Mapun, Tawi-Tawi (Cagayan de Sulu Island)
 Maripipi
 Pandami, Sulu (Lapac Island)
 Pangutaran, Sulu
 Pata, Sulu
 Patnanungan, Quezon
 Pilar, Cebu (Ponson Island)
 President Carlos P. Garcia, Bohol (Lapinig Island)
 Rapu-rapu, Albay (Rapu-rapu and Batan Island)
 Romblon, Romblon
 Sabtang, Batanes
 Samal, Davao del Norte
 San Antonio, Northern Samar (Dalupiri Island)
 San Francisco, Cebu (Pacijan and Tulang Island)
 San Jose, Romblon (Carabao Island)
 San Vicente, Northern Samar (Naranjo Islands)
 Santo Niño, Samar
 Sapa-Sapa, Tawi-Tawi
 Sarangani, Davao del Sur (Sarangani and Balut Islands)
 Siasi, Sulu
 Sibutu, Tawi-Tawi
 Simunul, Tawi-Tawi
 Sitangkai, Tawi-Tawi
 Socorro, Surigao del Norte (Bucas Grande Island)
 South Ubian, Tawi-Tawi
 Tagapul-an, Samar
 Tapul, Sulu
 Tingloy, Batangas (Maricaban Island)
 Turtle Islands, Tawi-Tawi
 Zumarraga, Samar

See also
 List of islands in the Philippines

Cities
Islands
Islands